Elaeocarpus kirtonii, commonly known as silver quandong, white quandong, brown hearted quandong, brownheart, mountain beech, Mowbullan whitewood, pigeonberry ash, white beech or whitewood, is species of flowering plant in the family Elaeocarpaceae and is endemic to eastern Australia. It is a large rainforest tree with buttress roots, regularly toothed, narrow elliptic to narrow oblong leaves, racemes of white flowers and pale blue, oval fruit.

Description
The leaves are dull green with prominent veins, regularly spaced teeth on the edges and turn red before falling. There are between twenty-five and thirty stamens.

Taxonomy
Elaeocarpus kirtonii was first formally described in 1886 by Frederick Manson Bailey in A Synopsis of the Queensland Flora, from an unpublished description by Ferdinand von Mueller.
The specific epithet (kirtonii) honours W. Kirton, who collected samples of the tree at Bulli in 1885 for Ferdinand von Mueller.

Distribution and habitat
Silver quandong grows from near Milton (35° S) in New South Wales to Eungella National Park (20° S) in tropical Queensland. It grows in tropical, sub-tropical and warm temperate rainforests but is often also seen in cooler and moister sites on  volcanic soils and on the richer alluvial soils.

Ecology
The fruit of E. kirtonii is eaten by a large variety of rainforest birds.

Conservation status
This quandong is listed as of "least concern" under the Queensland Government Nature Conservation Act 1992.

References

kirtonii
Oxalidales of Australia
Trees of Australia
Flora of Queensland
Flora of New South Wales
Taxa named by Frederick Manson Bailey
Plants described in 1886